Terni–Perugia–Sansepolcro railway is a railway line in Umbria, Italy. It is operated by Busitalia Sita Nord, a subsidiary of the Ferrovie dello Stato Italiane group.

History
The line was inaugurated on 12 July 1915. It was partially destroyed during World War II, and gradually reopened between October 1944 and May 1953. Passenger numbers peaked at 3,001,900 in 1975. In the late 1970s, due to its poor financial results and the risk of closure, the railway was taken over by the Province of Perugia.

In 2000, the rail operator was reorganized into a company owned by the regional government, and in December 2010 it was subsumed into a holding company gathering all the regional public transport services. In 2009, the company employed 211 people. In the late 2000s, the company depended on public subsidies for 71% to 87% of its operating income. In December 2005, a service linking Sansepolcro to Roma Termini station was launched. In April 2013 a train came off the rails near Umbertide, injuring 23 passengers. The regional public transport holding, Umbria Mobilità, was sold to Busitalia in 2014.

All passenger services were cancelled in September 2017 and partially restored in October 2018; they now operate on a  section between Città di Castello and Perugia Ponte San Giovanni.

Infrastructure
The main line has a maximum grade of 2%, reaching 6% on the branch between Perugia Sant'Anna and Perugia Ponte San Giovanni.

Stations north of Perugia, such as the ones in Umbertide and Città di Castello, tend to be close to the city center, while south of Perugia (such as in Marsciano and Todi) they are generally more remote.

Passenger services

According to a 2013 survey, 25.9% of trains ran with fewer than 30 people on board, reaching 71.6% between Sansepolcro and Città di Castello. The busiest segment is the line between Ponte San Giovanni and Perugia Sant'Anna with an average of 2,400 passengers per day. Several stations and stops recorded an average of zero passengers per day.

Rolling stock
As of 2014 the rolling stock was made up of 45 diesel-powered ALn 776 and four electric-powered Minuetto trains. The ALn 776 trains were built between 1986 and 1993. The four Minuettos were purchased in 2008. Owing to the high cost of spare parts, as of 2014 three are nonoperational, while one remains in active service.

Routes
The following stations, stops and halts were served in December 2010, many of them as request stops. As of May 2019, most are inactive; stations currently served by rail are marked with a green diamond.

Route Terni – Todi – Ponte San Giovanni – Perugia Sant'Anna:

 Terni
 Borgo Rivo
 Cesi
 San Gemini
 Montecastrilli
 Acquasparta
 Massa Martana
 San Faustino - Casigliano
 Collevalenza
 Todi Ponte Naia
 Todi Ponte Rio
 Pian di Porto
 Ilci - Pian dei Mori
 Fratta Todina - Monte Castello di Vibio
 Marsciano
 Cerqueto
 Papiano
 Fanciullata
 Deruta
 San Martino in Campo
 Balanzano
 Perugia - Ponte San Giovanni
 Piscille
 Perugia Pallotta
 Perugia Sant'Anna

Route Perugia Sant'Anna – Ponte San Giovanni – Umbertide – Sansepolcro:

 Perugia Sant'Anna
 Perugia Pallotta
 Piscille
 Perugia - Ponte San Giovanni  
 Ponte Valleceppi
 Pretola
 Ponte Felcino  
 Villa Pitignano  
 Ramazzano
 Ponte Pattoli - Civitella Benazzone  
 San Bartolomeo - Resina
 Solfagnano - Parlesca  
 Palazzaccia
 Pierantonio  
 Monte Corona
 Umbertide  
 Niccone
 Montecastelli
 Montecastelli Ponte Tevere  
 Ranchi
 Trestina  
 Canoscio
 San Secondo  
 Baucca Garavelle
 Città di Castello  
 Città di Castello Fornace
 Città di Castello Zona Industriale
 Cerbara
 Selci Lama
 San Giustino
 La Dogana
 Trebbio
 Sansepolcro

Gallery

References

Footnotes

Sources

External links
 Servizi ferroviari - Busitalia–Sita Nord

Railway lines in Umbria
Railway lines opened in 1915